Peggy Lu is an American actress and pharmacist, best known for her supporting role as convenience store entrepreneur and Venom host Mrs. Chen in the Sony's Spider-Man Universe (SSU) films Venom (2018) and Venom: Let There Be Carnage (2021), and the promotional web series Chen's Market (2021), a role she will reprise in Spider-Man: Across the Spider-Verse (2023) and a third Venom film (2024).

Lu was born in New York City, the daughter of a Taiwanese immigrant couple who settled in the US. Before pursuing her acting dreams, Lu followed her parents’ advice to attend higher education. She received a doctorate in pharmacy from the University of Colorado Denver. After graduating, she moved back to New York, where she began her professional acting career and also worked as a pharmacist. Her first movie is New Chinatown, with Lu playing the role of Aunt Jiang. Lu also has appeared in numerous film and television series as a guest star, including Kung Pow: Enter the Fist, NCIS: Los Angeles, Animal Kingdom, and Always Be My Maybe, amongst others.

She currently resides in New York. She is fluent in Mandarin and English.

Filmography

References

External links
 

Living people
American actresses of Taiwanese descent
American film actresses
American television actresses
American pharmacists
University of Colorado Denver alumni
Year of birth missing (living people)